Styrofoam is a trademarked brand of closed-cell extruded polystyrene foam (XPS), manufactured to provide continuous building insulation board used in walls, roofs, and foundations as thermal insulation and water barrier. This material is light blue in color and is owned and manufactured by DuPont. DuPont also has produced a line of green and white foam shapes for use in crafts and floral arrangements.

Styrofoam is colloquially used worldwide to refer to another material that is usually white in color and made of expanded (not extruded) polystyrene foam (EPS). It is often used in food containers, coffee cups, and as cushioning material in packaging. The trademarked term is used generically although it is a different material from the extruded polystyrene used for Styrofoam insulation.

Additionally, it is moderately soluble in many organic solvents, cyanoacrylate, and the propellants and solvents of spray paint.

History 
In the 1940s, researchers, originally at Dow's Chemical Physics Lab, led by Ray McIntire, found a way to make foamed polystyrene. They rediscovered a method first used by Swedish inventor Carl Georg Munters, and obtained an exclusive license to Munters's patent in the United States. Dow found ways to adapt Munters's method to make large quantities of extruded polystyrene as a closed cell foam that resists moisture. The patent on this adaptation was filed in 1947.

Uses 

Styrofoam has a variety of uses. Styrofoam is composed of 98% air, making it lightweight and buoyant.

DuPont produces Styrofoam building materials, including varieties of building insulation sheathing and pipe insulation. The claimed R-value of Styrofoam insulation is five per inch.

Styrofoam can be used under roads and other structures to prevent soil disturbances due to freezing and thawing.

DuPont also produces Styrofoam blocks and other shapes for use by florists and in craft products. DuPont insulation Styrofoam has a distinctive blue color; Styrofoam for craft applications is available in white and green.

Environmental issues 
The EPA and International Agency for Research on Cancer reported limited evidence that styrene is carcinogenic for humans and experimental animals, meaning that there is a positive association between exposure and cancer and that causality is credible, but that other explanations cannot be confidently excluded.

See also the expansive list of environmental issues of Polystyrene, among those it being non-biodegradable.

See also 
 List of generic and genericized trademarks
 National Inventors Hall of Fame
 Resin identification code
 Structural insulated panel

References

External links 

Bio-Styrofoam from cellulosic crystals, better insulator than styrofoam and supports 200 times its weight

Dow Chemical Company
Foams
Plastic brands
Brand name materials
Brands that became generic
Building insulation materials
Organic polymers
Swedish inventions
1941 in technology
Products introduced in 1941
American inventions